Ariane, jeune fille russe (Ariane, young Russian girl) is a 1920 novel by the French tennis player and writer Jean Schopfer, published under the pseudonym Claude Anet. It follows a young Russian woman who encounters a Don Juan and falls in love with him.

Adaptations
The novel has been adapted into film several times. In 1931 the German film Ariane was made, with an English-language version The Loves of Ariane and a French Ariane, jeune fille russe. All three were directed by Paul Czinner, and two starred Elisabeth Bergner. In 1957 Billy Wilder adapted the novel for his American film Love in the Afternoon. In 1970 Muzaffer Arlsan a Padres the novel for his Turkish film Arım Balım Peteğım.

"The Great Love", a Lebanese- Egyptian film starred by Farid Al Attrash and Faten Hamama, is based on the novel "Ariane, jeune fille russe" and was released in 1970 and scenes were taken in Lebanon.The daughter of a photographer who falls in love with a singer and ladies gallant.

In popular culture
In Vladimir Nabokov's 1930 short novel, The Eye, two of the female characters are reading Ariane, jeune fille russe.

References

1920 French novels
French romance novels
French novels adapted into films
Works published under a pseudonym